Auron may refer to: 

 Auron (comics), two fictional DC Comics superheroes
 Auron (ski resort)
 Auron (river) in central France, a tributary of the Yèvre
 Auron, a playable character in the Square role-playing game Final Fantasy X
 One of the 12 archetypal Orthogons, also known as a Golden Rectangle
 Auron (later AuRon), the main character in Dragon Champion, the first book in E. E. Knight's Age of Fire series
 AuronPlay, a Spanish YouTuber

See also
 Aurone, a class of chemical compounds
 Aaron (disambiguation)